Below are the results of the 2007 Biathlon World Championships 2007 for the women's mass start, which took place on 10 February 2007.

Results

References 

Women's Mass Start
2007 in Italian women's sport